Oecomys speciosus, also known as the savannah oecomys, arboreal rice rat, or Venezuelan arboreal rice rat, is a species of rodent in the genus Oecomys of family Cricetidae. It ranges over northeastern Colombia and much of Venezuela, including the island of Trinidad. This rodent lives in tropical rainforest and tropical dry forest, including secondary forest and gallery forest, as well as in savanna habitat.

References

Literature cited
Duff, A. and Lawson, A. 2004.  Mammals of the World: A checklist. New Haven: Yale University Press. .

Oecomys
Mammals of Colombia
Mammals of Trinidad and Tobago
Mammals of the Caribbean
Mammals of Venezuela
Mammals described in 1893
Taxa named by Joel Asaph Allen
Taxa named by Frank Chapman (ornithologist)
Taxonomy articles created by Polbot